William John Carr (June 17, 1876 in County Donegal – March 25, 1942 in Philadelphia) was an American rower who competed in the 1900 Summer Olympics. He was part of the American boat Vesper Boat Club, which won the gold medal in the eights.

References

External links
 
 

1876 births
1942 deaths
Rowers at the 1900 Summer Olympics
Olympic gold medalists for the United States in rowing
American male rowers
Medalists at the 1900 Summer Olympics
Sportspeople from County Donegal